Lena Jones Wade Springs (March 22, 1883 - May 17, 1942) was the first woman placed in nomination for Vice President of the United States at a political convention.  She was nominated at the 1924 Democratic National Convention.

A native of Pulaski, Tennessee, she attended public schools, followed by Sullins College and post-graduate work at Virginia College in Roanoke. She became chair of the English Department at Queens College in Charlotte, and married Col. Leroy Springs in 1913, a second marriage for both.

An enthusiastic supporter of women's rights, she became a Democratic National Committeewoman in 1922, and served as chair of the Credentials Committee in 1924. While her being supported for the vice presidential nomination was in essence a gesture, she received some votes in the election process, variously given as several, over 50, and 44.

She died on May 18, 1942, and is buried in Pulaski, Tennessee.

References 

1883 births
1942 deaths
Tennessee Democrats
Female candidates for Vice President of the United States
1924 United States vice-presidential candidates
Sullins College alumni
People from Pulaski, Tennessee
Women in Tennessee politics
Queens University of Charlotte faculty
20th-century American women politicians
20th-century American politicians
American women academics